may refer to:
Saiyūki, the Japanese language title of the Chinese classic Journey to the West
Saiyūki, a 1960 anime film based on Osamu Tezuka's manga adaptation of Journey to the West titled Boku no Son Goku, released in English as Alakazam the Great
Saiyūki, a 1978–1980 television drama based on Journey to the West, released in English as Monkey
Saiyuki (manga), a 1997–2002 manga based on Journey to the West more commonly referred to as Gensomaden Saiyuki
Saiyūki, a 1999 Japanese role-playing video game released in North America in 2001 as Saiyuki: Journey West
Saiyūki (TV series), a 2006 Japanese television drama based on Journey to the West featuring the members of boy band SMAP

See also
Journey to the West (disambiguation)
Travels to the West of Qiu Chang Chun